The 1996 Copa Perú season, the promotion tournament of Peruvian football.

In this tournament after many qualification rounds, each one of the 24 departments in which Peru is politically divided, qualify a team. Those teams plus the team relegated from First Division are divided in 6 groups by geographical proximity and each group winner goes to the Final round, staged in Lima (the capital).

The champion was promoted to 1997 Torneo Descentralizado.

Finalists teams
The following list shows the teams that qualified for the Regional Stage.

Final stage

Final group stage

Round 1

Round 2

Round 3

Round 4

Round 5

External links
  Copa Peru 1996
  Semanario Pasión

Copa Perú seasons
Cop